Eucosma discernata is a species of moth of the family Tortricidae. It is found in north-eastern China, Japan and the Russian Far East.

References

Moths described in 1966
Eucosmini